The Manhattan Brothers was a popular South African singing group in the 1940s and 1950s, during the Apartheid era. Their sound drew on American ragtime, jive, swing, doo-wop, and several other jazz strains, as well as African choral and Zulu harmonies. Members of the group included Joe Mogotsi, Ronnie Sehume, Rufus Khoza, the late Nathan Mdledle, and Miriam Makeba. Makeba, who went on to international fame, started her career with The Manhattan Brothers and was part of the group for much of the 1950s. The group had one US Billboard pop chart hit, "Lovely Lies", which peaked at number 45 in March 1956.

Joe Mogotsi died on 19 May 2011 in Johannesburg, following a long illness.

References

South African jazz ensembles